Mount Emerald Wind Farm  is a 180 MW wind farm situated on Mount Emerald, in Arriga, Shire of Mareeba,  Queensland, Australia. It is approximately 8 km WNW of Tolga, and 49 km SW of Cairns. The project is a joint venture between Port Bajool (land owner) and RATCH-Australia (wind farm developer and operator).  RATCH-Australia bought the project from Transfield Services in July 2011.

Construction 
The site was formerly used as a military training area in World War II so the site had to be carefully inspected to find any unexpoded ordnance; several were found and safely destroyed.

Operations 
The wind farm registered its first grid output in August 2018 and reached maximum output in January 2019. The electricity network around the wind farm is generally constrained; this has an impact on the total amount of electricity it can receive from the wind farm. Studies are being undertaken to increasing the capacity of the network using technologies such as synchronous condensers and grid-scale batteries.

Note: Asterisk indicates power output was limited during the month.

Environmental impact 
Environmental groups have claimed that the construction of roads and bases for the wind turbines caused significant destruction of the formerly untouched wilderness.

See also 

Wind power in Australia
List of wind farms in Queensland

References

External links 

 Mount Emerald wind farm photographs, State Library of Queensland

Wind farms in Queensland
Proposed wind farms in Australia
Buildings and structures in Far North Queensland